The Brighton Marathon is an annual marathon in Brighton and Hove, England. It was first held on 18 April 2010 and has usually been held in April every year since. The inaugural Brighton Marathon was set up by former international athlete Tim Hutchings and local athlete Tom Naylor.

History 
The first Brighton Marathon took place on 18 April 2010. The race opened to 12,000 entries, with 7,589 participating on race day. The course start line was at Preston Park. The route took in some of the sights of central Brighton before heading East towards Rottingdean. The race then headed west out to and around Hove, before returning on the seafront and finishing on Madeira Drive, close to Brighton Pier.

In Year 2 (April 2011), over 8,000 runners took part with spectator numbers estimated at around 120,000. The race has acquired the status of "Britain's No. 2 marathon", after the London Marathon, for its profile in the national running arena, for its standard of race organisation and for the publicity generated by the event. More than two hundred charities had runners in the 2011 event and this demand has led to an increase from 3,000 to 5,000 in the number of places being offered to charities in 2012.

The 2012 event saw a 20% increase on entries to an acceptance of 18,000, putting it in the top 12 running events in the UK. In September 2011, The Brighton Marathon was granted coveted Bronze Medal status by the World governing body, the International Association of Athletics Federations (IAAF).

The 2020 in-person edition of the race was cancelled due to the coronavirus pandemic.

Similarly, the 2021 edition of the race, originally scheduled for April, was postponed to  due to the pandemic, with many registrants given the option of transferring their entry to 2022 or obtaining a full refund. An error in setup led to the 2021 course being 568m too long, which affected the final result of the men's race when winner Neil McClements overtook Ollie Garrod, who had led the whole way, in the last 100m of the course.

Results 
The first Men's Elite Race in 2010 was won by Mongolian runner Bat-Ochiryn Ser-Od with a time of 2:19:05. Between 2011 and 2014, the Men's Elite Race course record was broken consecutively by Kenyans Philemon Boit, Peter Kimeli Some, Dominic Kangor and William Chebor. In 2014, Chebor set the current record with a time of 2:09:25. Kenyan Duncan Maiyo is the most successful athlete with back-to-back wins in 2015 and 2016. In both races, he was less than a minute over the course record. In 2017, Stuart Hawkes became the first English winner and first European winner in the Men's Elite Race with a time of 2:27:36.

The first Women's Elite Race, also in 2010, was won by Briton Joanna Bryce in 3:05:20. The course record was broken for three consecutive years by Alyson Dixon, Sviatlana Kouhan and Eunice Kales. Kouhan became the first non-British winner with a time of 2:41:22 in 2012, and Kales became the first non-European winner in 2013 with a time of 2:28:50 – the current course record. Alice Milgo, Pennina Wanjiru and Grace Momanyi all continued the success for Kenya in the following years, while Lishan Dula became the first Asian athlete to finish in the top three with her second-place finish in 2015. Helen Davies became the first Briton to win in six years with a time of 2:42:40 in 2017, and he retained the win in 2018 with an improved time of 2:38:41.

Elite race winners

Men

Women

Incidents
23-year-old Sam Harper Brighouse died during the 2013 race after collapsing in Grand Avenue and being taken to hospital. The inquest ruled he died of bowel ischemia and a gastro-intestinal haemorrhage, brought on by an idiosyncratic reaction to hyperthermia, dehydration, endurance exertion, hyperosmolar sports supplements and ibuprofen. The coroner stated Harper Brighouse's preparations for the race were appropriate.

Notes

References

External links
Brighton Marathon official website
Results for every participant for each year on official website
News article at The Argus

Marathons in the United Kingdom
Sport in Brighton and Hove
Annual sporting events in the United Kingdom
Recurring sporting events established in 2010
2010 establishments in England
Annual events in England
Spring (season) events in England